The Pakistan Penal Code,  abbreviated as  PPC, is a penal code for all offences charged in Pakistan. It was originally prepared by Lord Macaulay with a great consultation in 1860 on the behalf of the Government of India as the Indian Penal Code. After the independence in 1947, Pakistan inherited the same code and subsequently after several amendments by different governments, in Pakistan it is now a mixture of Islamic and English Law. Presently, the Pakistan Penal Code is still in effect and can be amended by the Parliament of Pakistan.

History 
The draft of the (British) Indian Penal Code was prepared by the First Law Commission and it was chaired by Lord Macaulay. Its basis is the law of England freed from superfluities, technicalities and local peculiarities. Suggestions were also derived from the French Penal Code and from Livingstone's Code of Louisiana. The draft underwent a very careful revision at the hands of Sir Barnes Peacock, Chief Justice, and puisne Judges of the Calcutta Supreme Court who were members of the Legislative Council, and it was passed into law in 1860. Macaulay did not survive to see the Penal Code's enactment.

Though it is principally the work of a man who had hardly held a brief, and whose time was devoted to politics and literature, it was universally acknowledged to be a monument of codification and an everlasting memorial to the high juristic attainments of its distinguished author. For example, even cyber crimes can be punished under the code.

Jurisdiction 
Section 1. Title and extent of operation of the Code. This Act shall be called the Pakistan Penal Code, and shall take effect throughout Pakistan.

 Section 4

The provisions of this Code apply also to any offence committed by:-

 (1)  any citizen of Pakistan or any person in the service of Pakistan in any place without and beyond Pakistan;
 (4)  any person on any ship or aircraft registered in Pakistan wherever it may be.

Explanation: In this section the word "offence" includes every act committed outside Pakistan which, if committed in Pakistan, would be punishable under this Code. Extension of Code to extraterritorial offences.

Punishments 

 Section 53.

The punishments to which offenders are liable under the provisions of this Code are:

 First,  Qisas ("retribution");
 Second,  Diyat;
 Third,  Arsh− (Pre-specified Compensation);
 Fourth,  Daman (Compensation determined by court to be paid by the offender to the victim for causing hurt not liable to Arsh);
 Fifth,  Ta'zir (punishment, usually corporal, that can be administered at the discretion of a judge)
 Sixth,  Death;
 Seventh,  Imprisonment for life;
 Eighth,  Imprisonment which is of two descriptions, namely:--

 Rigorous (i.e., with hard labour);
 Simple;

 Ninth,  Forfeiture of property;
 Tenth,  Fine

First five punishments are added by amendments and are considered Islamic Punishments, and very few have been sentenced to these punishments so far. Anyone who is sentenced to the first five  punishments can appeal to the Federal Shariat court.

See also 

 Section 420
 Court system of Pakistan
 Blasphemy law in Pakistan
 Copyright protection in Pakistan
 Gay rights in Pakistan
 Hudood Ordinance
Women related laws in Pakistan

References

External links 

Full text of the Pakistan Penal Code – up-to-date with all amendments – Pakistani.org
Pakistan Penal Code 1860 – pakistancode.gov.pk

Pakistani legislation
Government documents of Pakistan
Criminal codes
1947 establishments